Cathyalia okinawana is a species of snout moth in the genus Cathyalia. It was described by Hiroshi Yamanaka in 2003 and is known from Japan.

References

Moths described in 2003
Phycitini
Moths of Japan